Yevgeni Aleksandrovich Tarasov (born 25 March 1979) is a Kazakhstani professional football coach and a former player. He is an assistant manager of Caspiy.

Club career
He made his professional debut in the Kazakhstan Premier League in 1997 for FC Kairat. He played 3 games and scored 2 goals in the UEFA Intertoto Cup 2000 for FC Zenit St. Petersburg.

Honours
 Russian Premier League bronze: 2001.
 Russian Cup finalist: 2002.

References

1979 births
Living people
Kazakhstani footballers
Kazakhstani expatriate footballers
Kazakhstan international footballers
Russian Premier League players
FC Kairat players
FC Shakhter Karagandy players
FC Kyzylzhar players
FC Zenit Saint Petersburg players
FC Sokol Saratov players
FC Mordovia Saransk players
Expatriate footballers in Russia
Association football forwards